B48 may refer to:
 B48 (New York City bus), a bus line in Brooklyn
 HLA-B48, a HLA-B serotype
 Martin XB-48, an American aircraft
 BMW B48 Engine, an engine BMW AG produces